János Jakab (born July 23, 1986 in Budapest) is a Hungarian table tennis player. As of February 2013, Jakab is ranked no. 183 in the world by the International Table Tennis Federation (ITTF). Jakab is a member of the table tennis team for Levallois Sporting Club in Levallois-Perret, France, and is coached and trained by Péter Aranyosi. He is also right-handed, and uses the classic grip.

Jakab qualified for the men's singles tournament at the 2008 Summer Olympics in Beijing, by receiving an allocation spot from the Final World Qualification Tournament in Budapest, Hungary. He received a single bye in the preliminary round, before defeating French table tennis player and former Olympic bronze medalist Patrick Chila in his first match. Jakab progressed to the second round, but narrowly lost to European doubles champion Christian Süß of Germany, receiving a final set score of 1–4.

References

External links
 
 NBC 2008 Olympics profile

1986 births
Living people
Hungarian male table tennis players
Table tennis players at the 2008 Summer Olympics
Olympic table tennis players of Hungary
Table tennis players from Budapest
Table tennis players at the 2015 European Games
European Games competitors for Hungary
21st-century Hungarian people